Ziętek is a surname. Notable people with the surname include:

 Artur Ziętek (1978–2010), Polish pilot
 Bogusław Ziętek (born 1964), Polish trade union activist
 Ewa Ziętek (born 1953), Polish actress
 Jerzy Ziętek (1901–1985), Polish politician and general
 Tomasz Ziętek (born 1989), Polish actor and musician

See also
 

Polish-language surnames